Charles Hart (bap. 1625 – 18 August 1683) was a prominent British Restoration actor.

A Charles Hart was christened on 11 December 1625, in the parish of St. Giles Cripplegate, in London. It is not absolutely certain that this was the actor, though the name was not common at the time.. He was most likely the son of William Hart, a minor actor with the King's Men. Hart began his career as a boy player with the King's Men; he was an apprentice of Richard Robinson, longtime member of that company. Hart established his reputation by playing the role of the Duchess in The Cardinal, the tragedy by James Shirley, in 1641. Wright says in Historia histrionica that:"Hart and Clun, were bred up Boys at the Blackfriers; and Acted Womens Parts, Hart was [Richard] Robinson's Boy or Apprentice: He Acted the Dutchess in the Tragedy of the Cardinal, which was the first Part that gave him Reputation."

He served as a soldier in the English Civil War, and was an officer in Prince Rupert's regiment of cavalry, along with fellow actors Nicholas Burt and Robert Shatterell. Hart and the others most likely saw combat at the battles of Marston Moor and Naseby, and perhaps at Edgehill as well.

Hart then returned to acting; evidence suggests he was with other displaced English actors in Europe in 1646. In 1648, Hart, Walter Clun and eight other actors, were involved in an attempt to restart the King's Men company during the Puritan Commonwealth, which, perhaps unsurprisingly, did not succeed. On 5 February 1648, at the Cockpit Theatre, Hart and other King's Men were arrested for violating the ban against theatrical performance; they were caught in the midst of a performance of Rollo Duke of Normandy (in which Hart played the character Otto). Hart and the others were imprisoned for a short time, then released.

Just before the Restoration of the monarchy in 1660, acting resumed on a larger scale, and Hart seems to have been then a member of a company performing at the Cockpit playhouse, led by Michael Mohun. As soon as the King's Company was formed in 1660, Hart became one of its leading men; he specialised in playing the male half of witty, bantering couples. This type of dialogue in Restoration comedy was largely influenced by the talents and personalities of Hart and Nell Gwyn, in plays like James Howard's The Mad Couple; Gwyn was his mistress before she became Charles II's. Hart's natural dignity in playing royal roles was also often commented on by contemporaries, and in the heroic play he "was celebrated for superman roles, notably the arrogant, bloodthirsty Almanzor in John Dryden's Conquest of Granada."

When Hart played in Euterpe Restored in 1672, Richard Flecknoe composed the following lines:

Beauty to the eye, and music to the ear,
Such even the nicest critics must allow
Burbage was once and such Charles Hart is now.

Throughout his Restoration career, Hart filled a range of noteworthy parts. He was Cassio in early stagings of Shakespear's Othello; after 1669 he played the title role. He played roles in revivals of plays by Shakespeare, Ben Jonson, and John Fletcher —

 Hotspur in Henry IV, Part 1
 Brutus in Julius Caesar
 Mosca in Volpone
 Demetrius in The Humorous Lieutenant
 Michael Perez in Rule a Wife and Have a Wife
 Arbaces in A King and No King
 Amintor in The Maid's Tragedy
 Rollo in Rollo Duke of Normandy
 Welford in The Scornful Lady
 Don John in The Chances

— and in contemporary dramas, by John Dryden —

 Marc Antony in All for Love
 Porphyrius in Tyrannick Love
 Aurange Zebe in Aurang-zebe
 Celadon in The Maiden Queen
 Wildblood in An Evening's Love
 Cortez in The Indian Emperour
 Aurelian in The Assignation

— and by other dramatists —

 Horner in Wycherly's The Country Wife
 Manly in Wycherly's The Plain Dealer
 Phraartes in Crowne's The Destruction of Jerusalem
 Massinissa in Lee's Sophonisba, or Hannibal's Overthrow
 Alexander the Great in Lee's The Rival Queens
 Ziphares in Lee's Mythridates, King of Pontus
 Lord Delaware in Boyle's The Black Prince.

In 1682, when the King's Company joined with the Duke's Company to form the United Company, Hart retired due to poor health, with a pension of 40 shillings per week.

References

External links

1625 births
1683 deaths
English male stage actors
17th-century English male actors
Boy players